Luigi Luciani ForMemRS (23 November 1842, in Ascoli Piceno – 23 June 1919) was an Italian neuroscientist. He also contributed to Karel Frederik Wenckebach's work on what is now known as second-degree atrioventricular block of the heart in which Wenckebach described the periodicity of this block as "Luciani periodicity."

References

External links
http://www.biodiversitylibrary.org/bibliography/1853
http://circ.ahajournals.org/content/101/22/2662.full
http://www.whonamedit.com/doctor.cfm/2702.html

Italian neuroscientists
1842 births
1919 deaths
Foreign Members of the Royal Society
People from Ascoli Piceno